August Güttinger (10 July 1892 – November 1970) was a Swiss gymnast and Olympic Champion. He competed at the 1924 Summer Olympics, where he received a gold medal in parallel bars, and bronze medals in rope climbing and team combined exercises. He received a gold medal in team combined exercises at the 1928 Summer Olympics in Amsterdam.

References

1892 births
1970 deaths
Swiss male artistic gymnasts
Gymnasts at the 1924 Summer Olympics
Gymnasts at the 1928 Summer Olympics
Olympic gymnasts of Switzerland
Olympic gold medalists for Switzerland
Olympic medalists in gymnastics
Medalists at the 1928 Summer Olympics
Medalists at the 1924 Summer Olympics
Olympic bronze medalists for Switzerland
20th-century Swiss people